Abandoned Shopping Trolley Hotline is a 2000 compilation of previously unreleased material, including BBC Radio 1 studio sessions, outtakes and B-sides by UK band Gomez. Some of the tracks foreshadow the band's move into electronic-based music on 2002's In Our Gun.

Track listing
"Shitbag 9" – 0:30
"Bring Your Lovin' Back Here" – 3:36
"Emergency Surgery" – 3:04
"Hit on the Head" – 1:25
"Flavors" – 3:12
"78 Stone Shuffle" – 3:27
"We Haven't Turned Around (X-Ray Mix)" – 3:18
"Buena Vista" – 8:59
"Shitbag" – 1:03
"Steve McCroski" – 4:34
"Wharf Me" – 3:21
"High on Liquid Skin" – 2:22
"Rosemary" – 5:50
"The Cowboy Song" – 1:17
"Getting Better" (Lennon–McCartney) – 3:48

References

External links
 
 

Gomez (band) albums
2000 compilation albums
Virgin Records compilation albums